James Christopher Workman (born October 4, 1980) is an American retired child actor whose roles include Pugsley Addams in The Addams Family (1991) and Addams Family Values (1993). He is the older brother of actress Ariel Winter.

Early life
James Christopher Workman was born October 4, 1980 in Fairfax, Virginia, the son of Chrisoula "Crystal", a homemaker, and Glenn Workman, who runs a communications firm. His older sister is actress Shanelle Workman, and their younger sister is actress Ariel Winter.

Career
Jimmy Workman made his acting debut in 1991 as Pugsley Addams in the feature film The Addams Family. The eight-year-old Workman had accompanied his older sister Shanelle to her audition for the part of Wednesday Addams, which eventually went to actress Christina Ricci. Workman was playing on the set, and was noticed by director Barry Sonnenfeld and producer Scott Rudin, who asked him to read for the part of Pugsley, and cast him on that basis. Workman reprised the role in Addams Family Values in 1993.

Other small roles followed, in films such as Black Sheep, As Good as It Gets, and The Biggest Fan. His television work includes the series Matlock, Life with Louie, and the television film Christmas in Connecticut. 

Workman eventually retired from acting, and began a career working behind the camera on the technical staff of film and television production. He is a member of Teamsters Local 399, one of the trade unions that represent people who work in the film industry.

Personal life
As of 2019, Workman lives in California with his family.

Family legal dispute
In August 2013, Workman petitioned a court that he be granted custody of his then-15-year-old sister, actress Ariel Winter, stating that their other sister, Shanelle Gray, was an "unfit guardian" and a poor role model for Winter. Gray had been granted temporary guardianship of Winter in November 2012, following the accusation that their mother, Chrisoula Workman, had been physically and emotionally abusive toward Winter.  Workman, who spoke on behalf of their mother to dispute the accusations that had been leveled at her, lobbied the court for custody by stating that Gray allowed Winter to be publicly "sexualized", exploited Winter to promote her acting school, and used the money Winter earned as a cast member of the TV series Modern Family to finance "lavish parties and limousines," which Workman stated had torn their family apart. Workman also told the court that their father, Glenn Workman, who was in charge of Winter's estate, was unfit because his poor financial situation made him vulnerable to manipulation by Gray and her lawyers.

In May 2014, a settlement was reached among the parties by which Gray would retain custody of Winter, with Glenn maintaining control of her finances, and making required reports to the court. Superior Court Judge Daniel Murphy would retain jurisdiction over Winter until she turned 18 (January 28, 2016), while Gray and Chrisoula later released a statement stating that they were working toward reconciliation.

Filmography

References

External links
 
 

1980 births
Male actors from Virginia
American male child actors
American male film actors
American male television actors
American people of Greek descent
Living people
Actors from Fairfax, Virginia